Jokila is a surname. Notable people with the surname include:

Janne Jokila (born 1982), Finnish ice hockey player
Jarmo Jokila (born 1986), Finnish ice hockey player

See also
Jokela (surname)

Finnish-language surnames